Fair Plain (also "Fairplain"
) is an unincorporated community in Berrien County in the U.S. state of Michigan. It is a census-designated place (CDP) for statistical purposes and has no legal status as a municipality. The population was 7,631 at the 2010 census.

History
The community was named for the scenic character of the original town site.

Fairplain Plaza, located on M-139 on the east edge of Fair Plain, was the first shopping center in the area, opening in 1958. The original Fairplain Plaza was largely demolished by the late 1990s, but was subsequently rebuilt and expanded using different architecture techniques.

There was a failed proposal to incorporate Fair Plain as a city in 1975.

Geography

The Fair Plain CDP consists of the portion of St. Joseph Charter Township lying northeast of the St. Joseph River and a portion of Benton Charter Township. The CDP's boundaries are the city of Benton Harbor to the north, the St. Joseph River to the west and south, and M-139 to the east.

Demographics

As of the census of 2000, there were 7,828 people, 3,287 households, and 2,116 families residing in the CDP. The racial makeup of the CDP was 49.08% White, 47.42% Black or African American, 0.46% Native American, 0.66% Asian, 0.06% Pacific Islander, 0.88% from other races, and 1.43% from two or more races. Hispanic or Latino of any race were 1.67% of the population.

There were 3,287 households, out of which 27.1% had children under the age of 18 living with them, 43.2% were married couples living together, 17.3% had a female householder with no husband present, and 35.6% were non-families. 29.7% of all households were made up of individuals, and 10.0% had someone living alone who was 65 years of age or older.  The average household size was 2.37 and the average family size was 2.91.

In the CDP, the population was spread out, with 24.5% under the age of 18, 7.7% from 18 to 24, 29.5% from 25 to 44, 24.3% from 45 to 64, and 14.0% who were 65 years of age or older.  The median age was 38 years. For every 100 females, there were 91.9 males.  For every 100 females age 18 and over, there were 86.7 males.

The median income for a household in the CDP was $37,154, and the median income for a family was $45,950. Males had a median income of $34,524 versus $24,043 for females. The per capita income for the CDP was $20,344.  About 10.8% of families and 16.0% of the population were below the poverty line, including 30.5% of those under age 18 and 5.6% of those age 65 or over.

References

Unincorporated communities in Berrien County, Michigan
Census-designated places in Michigan
Unincorporated communities in Michigan
Census-designated places in Berrien County, Michigan